The 48th Telluride Film Festival took place on September 2–6, 2021 in Telluride, Colorado, United States. After the cancellation of the previous year's event due to the COVID-19 pandemic in Colorado, the festival required proof of vaccination, a negative COVID-19 test within 72 hours and masks worn indoor to prevent the spread of COVID-19.

Director Barry Jenkins, who previously annually has curated the festival's Calling Cards and Great Expectations programs, was appointed as this year's guest director. Telluride honored Riz Ahmed, Jane Campion, and Peter Dinklage as the awardees of the Silver Medallion. Film historian Annette Insdorf received the Special Medallion award.

Official selections

Main program

Guest Director's Selections
The films were selected and presented by the year's guest director, Barry Jenkins.

Filmmakers of Tomorrow

Student Prints
The selection was curated and introduced by Gregory Nava. It selected the best student-produced work around the world.

Calling Cards
The selection was curated by Barry Jenkins. It selected new works from promising filmmakers.

Great Expectations
The selection was curated by Barry Jenkins.

Backlot
The selection included behind-the-scene movies and portraits of artists, musicians, and filmmakers.

Silver Medallion
Riz Ahmed
Jane Campion
Peter Dinklage

Special Medallion
Annette Insdorf

References

External links
 

2021 film festivals
2021 in Colorado
48th